The Halifax School for the Deaf  (The Deaf and Dumb Institution, Halifax) was an institution in Halifax, Nova Scotia, Canada, which opened on 4 August 1856.  It was the first school of the deaf in Atlantic Canada. (The Halifax School for the Blind was opened on Morris Street in 1871.)  There was later a dispute over who the true founder was, William Gray (1806-1881), a deaf Scottish immigrant who was the first teacher in the back room of a house in Argyle Street, or George Tait (1828-1904), another deaf Scot, who claimed to have been the driving force behind the establishment of the school.  Gray was sacked in 1870 for being intoxicated and for threatening pupils with violence.

The first principal of the school was James Scott Hutton, who remained with the school 34 years.  William Cunard (son of Sir Samuel Cunard) eventually built a school, which was completed in 1896 and was attended by 90 students.  

Following the Halifax Explosion, the main building was temporarily closed for repairs. Half of the students attended classes on the campus of Acadia College in Wolfville, while others remained without education until the classes were relocated back to Halifax.

The school closed in June 1961.

A monument marks the location of the home, which was erected by the Eastern Canada Association of the Deaf.

See also 
History of Nova Scotia
History of Halifax, Nova Scotia
Alexander Graham Bell
 James Cuppaidge Cochran
 Francis Green (military officer)

References 

Texts
  Halifax School for the Deaf

Further reading 
  History of Halifax School for the Deaf
Fearon, James. History of Halifax School for the Deaf. (1857-1893)
J. Scott Hutton. Outlines of History and Biography. 1875
 J. Scott Hutton. Geography of Nova Scotia. 1869.
J. Scott Hutton, "Deaf-Mute Education in the British Maritime Provinces," American Annals of the Deaf, Volume 14 (Raleigh, N. C.: Press of the Institution for the Deaf and Dumb and the Blind), pg 65-82.
George Hutton - Scott's father, part 1
George Hutton - Scott's father, part 2
  George Hutton, "Practicability and Advantages of Writing and Printing Natural Signs," American Annals of the Deaf, Volume 14 (Raleigh, N. C.: Press of the Institution for the Deaf and Dumb and the Blind), pg 157.
J. Scott Hutton, Language Lessons for the Deaf and Dumb (Halifax, N. S.: The Pupils at the Institution Press, 1878).
 Autobiography of George Tait, a deaf mute, who first gave instructions to the deaf and dumb in the city of Halifax ; also an extract from an American paper on teachers and modes of teaching the deaf and dumb. (1892)

History of Halifax, Nova Scotia
Schools for the deaf in Canada